Coastal Erosion in Louisiana is the process of steady depletion of wetlands along the state's coastline in marshes, swamps, and barrier islands, particularly affecting the alluvial basin surrounding the mouth of the Mississippi River at the foot of the Gulf of Mexico on the Eastern half of the state's coast.  In the last century, Southeast Louisiana has lost a large portion of its wetlands and is expected to lose more in the coming years, with some estimates claiming wetland losses equivalent to up to 1 football field per hour.  One consequence of coastal erosion is an increased vulnerability to hurricane storm surges, which affects the New Orleans metropolitan area and other communities in the region.  The state has outlined a comprehensive master plan for coastal restoration and has begun to implement various restoration projects such as fresh water diversions, but certain zones will have to be prioritized and targeted for restoration efforts, as it is unlikely that all depleted wetlands can be rehabilitated.  
  
The process of coastal erosion is the result of various factors, including sea level rise, the loss of deposition of sediments to the Mississippi River delta, and the consequent permanent flooding of marshes, wetlands, and neighboring areas along the Louisiana coast of the Gulf of Mexico. Contributing factors include the blockage of traditionally occurring deposits of fresh water and silt from the river caused by man-made levees which have been built up and down most of the river over the last century, which now impede the river's ability to replenish its southernmost alluvial plains which are constantly dependent on the infusion of the river's once plentiful deposits which usually occurred during annual high stage floods in the springtime, the kind of which the river-levees now serve to buffer against for the protection of residents, livestock, and property residing in regions adjacent to the river throughout the Mississippi River valley. The deterioration results in the death of fresh and brackish water plants historically part of the ecosystem, which are not only a vital feature of the wetlands' topography, but also serve to capture silt, and thus are needed to build up and sustain marsh structures.  As fresh and brackish water plant habitats recede, salt water from the Gulf of Mexico further encroaches, killing off more non-saltwater plants, thus further eroding pre-existing mud formations that these plants had once supported.

Other factors exacerbating coastal erosion in Southeast Louisiana include the presence of canals and navigational routes dug through marshes and swamps, often to accommodate logistical needs of the petrochemical industry, as well as the previous practice of logging, all of which have allowed the incursion of saltwater (saline) from the Gulf into previously fresh and brackish water plant habitats.  While land subsidence is dominated by Glacial Isostatic Adjustment (GIA), sediment compression is next factor further compounding the problem.  Sea-level rise attributed to global warming, though not a root cause, is also considered a contributing factor and future concern.

Causes and factors

Coastal erosion is defined as "the loss of coastal lands due to the net removal of sediments or bedrock from the shoreline." South Louisiana is one of the main places being affected. In 1973, Louisiana State University published “Environmental Atlas and Multi-Use Management Plan for South-Central Louisiana”  analyzing the issue and possible solutions. The solutions were not implemented and the issues the report sought to fix, are still issues.
 
Man-made levees, which were designed to protect residents and property adjacent to the river, block spring flood water that would otherwise bring fresh water and sediment to marshes. Swamps have been extensively logged, leaving canals and ditches that allow saline water to move inland. Canals dug for the oil and gas industry also allow storms to move sea water inland, where it damages swamps and marshes. Rising sea levels attributed to global warming have exacerbated the problem. As sea levels continue to rise, the land subsidence rates among Louisiana's coast will also increase. Some researchers estimate that the state is losing a land mass equivalent to 30 football fields every day. This estimate reflects the rapid rates of land subsidence in Louisiana. 

An extensive levee system aided by locks and dams has been developed in the waterways of the lower Mississippi River.  The levees, designed to prevent flooding along the waterways, on one hand, prevent silt from draining into the river yet also from being distributed into the marshes downriver.  With no new accretion and with steady subsidence, the wetlands slowly are replaced by encroaching saltwater form the Gulf.  As a result of this apparent dilemma, large areas of marsh are being lost to the ocean. Since 1930 water has consumed more than 1,900 square miles (4,900 km2) of the state's land.  This loss equates to the disappearance of 25 square miles (65 km2) of wetlands each year or a football-field-sized area every 30 minutes. This loss can be reversed, at least in some areas, but only with large scale restoration, including the removal of levees to allow the Mississippi River to carry silt into these areas.

Prior to the building of levees on the Mississippi River, the wetlands were kept in balance by occasional floods, which fill the area with sediment, and subsidence, the sinking of land. These man-made levees contribute to extensive down-stream flooding and sediment pollution in the Mississippi River Delta. After the levees were built, however, flood sediment flowed directly into the Gulf of Mexico. This subsidence along with the recent sea level rise tipped the balance toward subsidence rather than marsh growth. This, along with the canals built in the area, caused decline of the wetlands and also caused less weakening of and less protection from recent hurricanes such as Hurricane Katrina. The Lake Pontchartrain Basin Foundation has developed a comprehensive management plan for the eastern regions of the Louisiana coast, placing emphasis upon restoration of riverine habitats, cypress swamps and fringing marsh. This could be a model applied to other coastal regions.

Subsidence may be due to other factors as well. Some observers blame the direct effects of oil and gas extraction, known as fracking.  They believe the removal of subsurface materials, such as oil, hastened the rates of land subsidence. They contend that, as billions of barrels of oil and saltwater and as trillions of cubic feet of gas were removed from the subterranean structures in which they had accumulated over millions of years, these structures lost their ability to support the weight of the earth above.  As these structures slowly collapsed, the soil above gradually subsided. The wetlands on the surface began to sink into the gulf waters. Others argue that subsidence is a natural process in deltas, as sediments compress, and that the real problem is the lack of flood waters that would normally deposit new layers of sediment. The role of hurricanes is also a matter of disagreement; some studies show that hurricanes actually build elevation in marshes. A new and important factor is rising sea levels associated with global warming.

In addition to subsidence is the presence of canals which were dug through the marshes and swamps to service oil and gas wells to facilitate oil and gas exploration, which have enabled salt water intrusion from the Gulf of Mexico.  In similar fashion, the construction of the now-closed Mississippi River Gulf Outlet (MRGO) introduced salt water into freshwater and intermediate marshes in St. Bernard Parish, which is adjacent to New Orleans, and facilitated significant erosion.

Another factor that damaged wetlands was large scale logging, particularly the extensive logging of cypress forests in the early 1900s.  One early logger described it this way: "We just use the old method of going in and cutting down the swamp and tearing it up and bringing the cypress out. When a man's in here with all the heavy equipment, he might as well cut everything he can make a board foot out of; we're not ever coming back in here again." This logging often required construction of canals, which, once the logging was finished, allowed salt water to enter the wetlands and prevent regeneration of the cypress.

As if these problems were not enough, the introduction of nutria an invasive species from South America in the 1930s provided an entirely new species of grazing mammal. Although only a few escaped, there are now millions. Natural grazing by muskrat was now accelerated by grazing from nutria.  By removing plants, nutria both cause loss of vegetation, and, perhaps more seriously, a loss of dead organic matter which would otherwise accumulate as peat and raise the level of the marsh One of the most important natural controls on nutria is large alligators, which may provide a useful tool for biological control of nutria, and therefore for reduced impacts of grazing.

Terrebonne and Lafourche Parishes in Southeast Louisiana, with a combined population of 209,136, are at great risk of going underwater due to coastal erosion. It is estimated with the current rate of erosion, 75 square kilometers a year, within fifty to eighty years, these areas and their surrounding parishes will be underwater.  

Erosion from heavy storms, climate change, and human interference with the environment contribute to erosion in South Louisiana. The Gulf of Mexico brings heavy rains and hurricanes to this region. This loosens the sediments in the marshes, and along the Mississippi River, allowing them to be carried away by the water. Human interference would be the diversion of the Mississippi river and other rivers. The diversion causes sediments to be deposited in places other than where it normally would be.

Oil company canals 
The dredging of canals across the southern marshlands has long been blamed for coastal erosion. What was then the Orleans Levee Board, now the Southeast Louisiana Flood Protection Authority operating as the East and West divisions, filed a lawsuit in July 2013 against 97 oil and gas companies for damages, claiming the 50 miles of marsh swamps, with stands of cypress that buffered Gulf storms, were "shredded by oil industry canals". It was considered to be an  "entire ecosystem tanking", the "largest ecological catastrophe in North America since the dust bowl.", and "a wetland dying". “When you talk about dredging those canals, yes, it now appears to have been a pretty stupid thing to do” . . . . “But no one ever dreamed it would be an issue or that the coast would waste away.” —John Laborde, Founder, Tidewater Marine, 2010. This was not a new hypothesis as Percy Viosca, a Tulane graduate ultimately fired by then-Governor Long and brought back under another administration, stated “Man-made modifications in Louisiana wetlands, which are changing the conditions of existence from its very foundations, are the result of flood protection, deforestation, deepening channels[,] and the cutting of navigation and drainage canals.”, and concluded with “Time is ripe for an enormous development of the Louisiana wetlands along new and [more] intelligent lines.”, and this was in 1925.

Consequences
The many benefits of the wetlands found in this region were not recognized by a majority of policy makers early in the 20th century. Wetlands provide many important ecological services including, fisheries production, resting areas for migratory species, carbon storage, water filtration and enhanced disagreement over the relative importance of these factors, not to mention flood control.

Southeastern Louisiana's disappearing wetlands have a broad impact ranging from cultural to economic.  Commercial fishing in Louisiana accounts for more than 300 million dollars of the state's economy.  More than 70% of that amount stems from species such as shrimp, oysters and blue crabs that count on the coastal wetlands as a nursery for their young.  Annually Louisiana sells more than 330,000 hunting licenses and 900,000 fishing licenses to men and women who depend on the wetlands as a habitat for their game.  Additional recreational activities such as boating, swimming, camping, hiking, birding, photography and painting are abundant in wetland areas. Wetlands host a variety of trees such as the bald cypress, tupelo gum and cottonwood.  Other plants such as the dwarf palmetto and wax myrtle and submerged aquatic plants such as Vallisneria and Ruppia are native to Louisiana wetlands. Wetland plants act as natural filters, helping to remove heavy metals, sewage, and pesticides from polluted water before reaching the Gulf of Mexico.  Animal species native to these areas include osprey, anhinga, ibis, herons, egrets, manatees, alligators, and beavers. Although there are several naturally occurring forces that adversely affect the wetland regions of Louisiana, many believe it is human intervention that has caused the majority of the decline.

As the wetlands disappear, more and more people are leaving wetland areas. Since the coastal wetlands support an economically important coastal fishery, the loss of wetlands is adversely affecting this industry.

Another consequence of coastal erosion is the loss of sandbars off the coast of Louisiana. The sandbars off of Louisiana's coast protect Louisiana's coast from storm surges and high speed winds that come with hurricanes from the Gulf of Mexico. In the past, these sandbars have helped minimize the damage to Louisiana's coast from hurricanes. However, as coastal erosion continues to cause these sandbars to degrade, the damage taken by Louisiana's coastline continues to increase.

Because of this loss of Louisiana's coastline, many Louisiana communities are being affected. Some communities are experiencing flooding on a much more regular basis. If this loss of coastline continues, many of these communities will have to relocate. Some communities already have completely located, uprooting everyone who lives there. Therefore, coastal erosion is having a much greater effect on Louisiana residents than many people believe.

Proposed and attempted solutions
There are several projects and proposals to save coastal areas by reducing human damage, some of which have been attempted, including restoring natural floods from the Mississippi. Without such restoration, coastal communities will continue to disappear.  One of the primary methods that has been developed are freshwater diversions, which extract water from Mississippi River at strategic locations and transport fresh water and silt from the river through aqueducts and then pump and distribute them into nearby estuaries.  This process invigorates freshwater plant life and re-introduces silt into the estuaries.  Freshwater diversions have not been without controversy and have encountered some opposition, primarily from oyster harvesters who believe that the current high level salinity is needed in their state-licensed zones in order to maintain healthy production.  Another method of coastal restoration is the direct planting of new marsh grasses and other forms of sustainable plant life into affected areas.  There is the practice of seeding, which may be turn out to be more productive than direct planting, which often entails the dropping large amounts of seeds from crop-dusters intended to grow into freshwater plants.   Mangrove seeds have been tried because when grown they have the benefit of reducing marsh water salinity.  Transporting already-dredged material from the Mississippi river to marshes, swamps, and barrier islands is also an option.  Some have proposed the removal of river levees in certain low-populated areas to allow fresh water and silt dispersion into marshes, though this method is controversial and has yet to be attempted.

The Louisiana State Coastal Restoration Authority has developed a master plan which outlines the state's strategy for achieving future coastal restoration as well as flood protection.  Current Louisiana law stipulates that all oil and gas revenue royalties collected by the state go towards coastal restoration.  However, under present arrangement with the Federal government Louisiana, is only able to receive a small percentage of royalties and that the rest go to the Federal government.  However, starting in 2018 Louisiana will be able to receive 37.5 million dollars from all new leases, though pre-existing leases will still fall under the prior state/federal revenue sharing arrangement.   Proceeds from part of the BP oil spill lawsuits and federal fines will also go towards coastal restoration.

One way to combat coastal erosion is to try and plant more vegetation in Louisiana's wetlands. The roots of plants help hold soil in place and stop the soil from eroding. By adding more vegetation to the wetlands, the soil can be made more firm and less likely to erode. However, salt water intrusion is killing lots of these plants, so keeping the plants from dying can help impede the process of coastal and wetland erosion.

Another way to combat coastal erosion is to create seawalls and breakwaters. Seawalls are manmade barriers that are erected to keep seawater from reaching the coast. Because the seawater is unable to reach the coast, the water is unable to erode the coastline, thus preventing coastal erosion. Breakwaters function much like seawalls, except that they are not manmade, they are made from large formations of rocks stacked near each other. They are not as effective as seawalls in stopping water from reaching the coast, however, they allow seawater to bring sediment within its barrier, but stop the retreating water from removing sediment, thus helping coastlines build up and replenish.

Estimates are that the area will continue to erode, in part due to a dearth of plant nutrients. Solutions are numerous; however, governments and organizations have problems implementing them. Industry, navigation, and flood control are factors that have to be taken into account with the solutions. One of the most drastic solutions would be diverting the Mississippi river to flow into its delta. A shift in industry locations, navigation, and populations would allow the wetlands to be restored with less interference. Alternatively, increasing sustainability standards would allow the issue to be resolved quicker. Creating more ecologically friendly infrastructure in the areas would allow the marshes to grow and the soil would strengthen.

See also

Mississippi River Delta
Mississippi Alluvial Plain
Wetlands
Chemistry of wetland dredging

References

Coastal erosion in the United States
Environment of Louisiana
Environmental issues in the United States
Geography of Louisiana